The 99th anniversary Isle of Man TT Festival ran between Saturday 27 May and Friday 9 June on the 37.73-mile Mountain Course. The first week (between 27 May and 2 June) is known as the practice week, before the real action commenced on 3 June. There were 6 races in TT week. John McGuinness broke the lap record during practice for the Superbike race and then did it again in the race itself. He recorded a lap of 17:41.71, breaking the Superbike record from last year by 8.62 seconds and his outright lap record by 2.1 seconds.

McGuinness then went on to take his first TT hat-trick by winning the Senior TT on 9 June, destroying the lap record in the process. He set a lap of 17:39.95 from a standing start then 17:29.26 on his 2nd lap (breaking his own lap record by 10 seconds). However, the meeting was overshadowed by the death of Japanese rider Jun Maeda on 6 June due to injuries suffered in a practice crash.

Results
Race 1 – Jester Interactive TT Superbike Race  3 June (6 laps – 226.38 miles)

New Outright Lap Record: John McGuinness, 127.933 mph

Race 2 – Scottish Life International TT Superstock Race  5 June (4 laps – 150.92 miles)

Race 3 – Hilton Hotel & Casino Sidecar TT, Race A  5 June (3 laps – 113.00 miles)

Race 4 – Isle of Man Steam Packet Supersport Junior TT  7 June (4 laps – 150.92 miles)

New Lap Record: John McGuinness, 123.975 mph

Note: Ian Hutchinson did finish 2nd in the Supersport race, but was later disqualified, as his Kawasaki ZX-6 was deemed to be illegal due to a 0.2mm (0.02 cm) difference in cam dimensions. However, McAdoo Racing (Hutchinson's team) have lodged an appeal to have the position re-instated.

Race 5 – Hilton Hotel & Casino Sidecar TT, Race B  7 June (3 laps – 113.19 miles)

Race 6 – Jester Interactive Senior TT  9 June (6 laps – 226.38 miles)

New Outright Lap Record: John McGuinness, 129.451 mph

Notes
 Major alterations to the Snaefell mountain course are carried out for the 2006 TT Races with road widening at the Windy Corner carried-out over the winter of 2005–2006.
 Ryan Farquhar misses the 2006 TT Races after breaking an arm after crashing a 250cc motor-cycle at the Cookstown Races. His place is taken by Adrian Archibald in the Suzuki team. However, Ryan Farquhar makes a return to the Mountain Course when he races in the 2006 Manx Grand Prix.  
Practice for the 2006 Isle of Man TT Races is the first complete all dry session since 1957.  Dave Molyneux and Daniel Sayle during Thursday afternoon practice session crashed at Rhencullen after the sidecar outfit experiences a 145 mph Donald Campbell "bluebird style-flip."

Sources

External links
 Mountain Course map
 Detailed Race Results
 Isle of Man today MAC 3 report of new TT lap record by John McGuinness

2006 in British motorsport
Isle of Man TT
2006
2006 in motorcycle sport